Stade Agoè-Nyivé is a multi-use stadium in Lomé, Togo.  It is currently used mostly for football matches and is the home stadium of Dynamic Togolais.  The stadium holds 2,000 people.

Football venues in Togo
Buildings and structures in Lomé